Events in the year 1897 in Uruguay.

Incumbents
President: Juan Idiarte Borda until August 25, Juan Lindolfo Cuestas

Events

 Revolution of 1897: Blanco forces led by Aparicio Saravia stages an insurrection against the incumbent Colorado Party.

Births

Deaths
August 25 - Juan Idiarte Borda, President, assassinated

References